Karen Skelton (born May 11, 1961) is an American political strategist and lawyer working at the highest levels of national politics and state public policy issues. Most recently, she was named Senior Advisor to Secretary of Energy Jennifer Granholm at the U.S. Department of Energy in the Biden-Harris Administration.

Political career 
Skelton has a reputation for working on complex subjects from energy, telecommunications, economic workforce issues and environmental policy across legislative, executive, legal, and regulatory arenas. She worked in the White House during the Clinton Administration, the United States Department of Justice, and the Department of Transportation. Skelton has also served as delegate to the Democratic National Convention for Hillary Clinton twice.

Private Sector 
In 2000, Skelton co-founded and managed the Washington D.C. based public affairs firm, Dewey Square Group. In 2011, Skelton established her own Sacramento-based political and strategic consulting firm, Skelton Strategies. She served as the CEO and managing editor of The Shriver Reports, and in that role, she was the coordinating producer of an Emmy-nominated and Academy Award Honoree for the HBO documentary, Paycheck to Paycheck: The Life and Times of Katrina Gilbert.

Skelton played an integral role in the launch of the Lawyers for a Sustainable Economy (LSE) Initiative, a law firm-led effort now housed at Stanford University delivering $23 million worth of free legal services by the end of 2020 to advance sustainability in energy, transportation, and land use.  LSE was announced at the 2018 Global Climate Action Summit in San Francisco, CA in partnership with Former California Governor Jerry Brown and Former California Attorney General Xavier Becerra.

Skelton serves on the Advisory Committee of the Public Policy Institute of California and has served on the National Park Foundation Council and National Advisory Council for the Institute of Governmental Studies at the University of California, Berkeley.

Publications 
Skelton has been a guest contributor to the Sacramento Bee, as well as the Huffington Post, and has also been quoted in publications including The New York Times, The Los Angeles Times, and The Atlantic.

Education 
Skelton earned her bachelor's degree from the University of California, Los Angeles, where she graduated with honors in English. She then received her master's degree from Harvard University's Kennedy School of Government, and later, a J.D. from the University of California, Berkeley.

Personal 
Skelton is the daughter of George Skelton, a political columnist for The Los Angeles Times, and Nancy Skelton, a former political writer and columnist for The Los Angeles Times as well as The Sacramento Bee. Skelton and her husband have two children.

References

External links

1961 births
Living people
Harvard Kennedy School alumni
UC Berkeley School of Law alumni
University of California, Los Angeles alumni
American political consultants
American women chief executives
21st-century American women